SS Richard H. Alvey was a Liberty ship built in the United States during World War II. She was named after Richard H. Alvey, an American jurist who served as Chief Judge of the supreme court of the State of Maryland, the Maryland Court of Appeals and subsequently served as the Chief Justice of the Court of Appeals of the District of Columbia.

Construction
Richard H. Alvey was laid down on 24 May 1942, under a Maritime Commission (MARCOM) contract, MCE hull 53, by the Bethlehem-Fairfield Shipyard, Baltimore, Maryland; she was sponsored by Mrs. Holbrooke Bradley, the daughter of Paul Patterson, the owner of The Baltimore Sun, and was launched on 15 July 1942.

History
She was allocated to A.H. Bull & Co., Inc., on 29 July 1942. On 29 September 1947, she was laid up in the National Defense Reserve Fleet, Beaumont, Texas. She was sold for scrapping on 14 March 1961, to Luria Brothers & Co., for $61,789.22. She was withdrawn from the fleet on 29 March 1961.

References

Bibliography

 
 
 
 

 

Liberty ships
Ships built in Baltimore
1942 ships
Beaumont Reserve Fleet